John Frare is a former Italy international rugby league footballer who played in the 1990s and 2000s. He played for Parramatta in the NSWRL and ARL competitions.

Playing career
Frare made his first grade debut in round 7 of the 1994 NSWRL season against Penrith at Parramatta Stadium. Frare scored a try on debut as Parramatta lost the match 34-10. Frare would play 17 games for Parramatta over two seasons alternating between halfback and winger.

International career
Frare represented Italy in one game of the 1999 Mediterranean Cup against France. In 2000, Frare played three games for Italy at the 2000 Emerging Nations World Cup.

References

Year of birth missing (living people)
Parramatta Eels players
Italy national rugby league team players
Australian rugby league players
Rugby league halfbacks
Rugby league wingers
Living people